Quemchi Airport,  is an airport  west of Quemchi, a coastal town in the Los Lagos Region of Chile. Quemchi is on Chiloé Island, on an inlet off the Gulf of Ancud.

See also

Transport in Chile
List of airports in Chile

References

External links
OpenStreetMap - Quemchi
OurAirports - Quemchi
FallingRain - Quemchi Airport

Airports in Chile
Airports in Chiloé Archipelago